Hallie is a feminine given name.

People with the name 
Hallie Anderson (1885–1927), American dance orchestra conductor and theater band director
Hallie Olivere Biden (born 1973), American school counselor and executive
Hallie Beachem Brooks (1907–1985), African-American academic
Hallie Quinn Brown (1845–1949), African American educator
Hallie Buckley, New Zealand bioarchaeologist and professor
Hallie Champlin (1872–1935), American tennis player
Hallie Morse Daggett (1878–1964), American first woman
Hallie D'Amore (1942–2006), American make-up artist
Hallie Earle (1880–1963), American physician
Hallie Eisenberg (born 1992), American actress
Hallie Ephron (born 1948), American novelist
Hallie Farmer (1881–1960), American college professor
Hallie Flanagan (1890–1969), American theatrical producer and director
Hallie Foote (born 1950), American actress
Hallie Ford (1905–2007), American business person and philanthropist
Hallie Haglund (born 1982), American comedy writer
Hallie Parrish Hinges (1868–1950), American singer
Hallie Jackson (born 1984), American television news anchor
Hallie Lieberman, American sex and gender historian
Hallie Lomax (1915–2011), African American journalist
Hallie Meyers-Shyer (born 1987), American actress and director
Eliza Hall "Hallie" Nutt Parsley (1842–1920)
Hallie E. Queen (died 1940), American writer
Hallie Erminie Rives (1874–1956), American novelist
Hallie H. Rowe (1896–1992), American politician
Hallie Rubenhold (born 1971), British-American historian
Hallie Sargisson (1907–2010), American politician
Hallie C. Stillwell (1897–1997), American schoolteacher
Hallie Taufo'ou (born 1994), American rugby union player
Hallie Todd (born 1964), American actress and producer
Hallie Paxson Winsborough (1865–1940), American church worker and activist

See also 
Hallie (disambiguation)
Halle (name)

Feminine given names